James Michael Lachey (born June 4, 1963) is a radio analyst for Ohio State football and a former American football offensive tackle who played for ten seasons in the National Football League with the San Diego Chargers, Los Angeles Raiders, and Washington Redskins.

Lachey graduated from St. Henry High School and then played college football at Ohio State University, where he was an All-American offensive guard.  He was a three-time Pro Bowl player in 1987 with the Chargers, and 1990 and 1991 with the Redskins as a member of "The Hogs."  He helped the Redskins win Super Bowl XXVI.  He was also a three-time All-Pro selection.

Personal life
Lachey later became a broadcaster and wrote a book called Jim Lachey: The Ultimate Protector.

Lachey currently is a radio broadcaster for Buckeyes football games. His son Luke, currently a tight end on the Iowa Hawkeyes football team, says Jim encouraged him to make his own college decision, "pick wherever I want to go, it’s not about anyone else.”

Lachey coached for the Columbus Destroyers during their run to the XXI Arena Bowl in 2007.

Awards and honors
NCAA
1984 First-team All-American

NFL
Three-time NFL All-Pro First-team
Three-time NFL Pro Bowl selection
Super Bowl XXVI winner (as a member of the Washington Redskins)

References

External links
http://www.pro-football-reference.com/players/LachJi00.htm
https://web.archive.org/web/20101028132857/http://www.buckeyesportspage.com/live/content/info/staff.html

1963 births
Living people
All-American college football players
American Conference Pro Bowl players
American football offensive tackles
College football announcers
Los Angeles Raiders players
National Conference Pro Bowl players
Ohio State Buckeyes football players
Ohio State Buckeyes football announcers
People from St. Henry, Ohio
Players of American football from Ohio
San Diego Chargers players
Washington Redskins players